Mercury-Redstone 2 (MR-2) was the test flight of the Mercury-Redstone Launch Vehicle just prior to the first crewed American space mission in Project Mercury. Carrying a chimpanzee named Ham on a suborbital flight, Mercury spacecraft Number 5 was launched at 16:55 UTC on January 31, 1961, from LC-5 at Cape Canaveral, Florida. The capsule and Ham, the first great ape in space, landed safely in the Atlantic Ocean 16 minutes and 39 seconds after launch.

Background

The previous Mercury-Redstone mission, MR-1A, flew a trajectory that was too steep with accelerations too high for a human passenger. Mercury-Redstone 2 would follow a more flattened trajectory.

Mission

Mercury spacecraft No. 5 contained six new systems that had not been on previous flights: environmental control system, attitude stabilization control system, live retrorockets, voice communications system, "closed loop" abort sensing system, and a pneumatic landing bag.

Six chimpanzees (four female and two male) and 20 medical specialists and animal handlers from Holloman Air Force Base, New Mexico, where the chimpanzees lived and were trained, were moved into quarters behind Hangar S at Cape Canaveral, Florida on January 2, 1961. The six chimpanzees were trained in Mercury simulators for three weeks. The day before the flight, two chimpanzees were chosen for the mission: one primary, Ham, and one backup, a female chimpanzee named Minnie. The competition was fierce, but Ham was full of energy and good humor. Ham was named in honor of Holloman Aerospace Medical Center. Ham was from Cameroon, Africa, (original name Chang, Chimp No. 65) and was purchased by the USAF July 9, 1959. He was 3 years 8 months old at launch.

At 12:53 UTC, January 31, 1961, Ham was inserted into the spacecraft. The countdown was then delayed almost four hours because of a hot inverter, and several other minor problems.

At 16:55 UTC the MR-2 lifted off. One minute after the launch, computers reported that the flight path angle was at least one degree too high and rising. At two minutes, the computers predicted a 17 g (167 m/s²) acceleration. At 2 minutes 17 seconds into the flight, the Redstone's liquid oxygen (LOX) fuel was depleted. The closed-loop abort system sensed a change in engine chamber pressure when the LOX supply was depleted and fired the launch escape system. The abort signaled a Mayday message to the recovery forces.

The high flight angle, and the early abort, caused the maximum velocity of the spacecraft, relative to the Earth's surface, to be  instead of the planned . The retrorockets had been jettisoned during the abort and therefore could not be used to slow down the spacecraft.

Another problem occurred at 2 minutes and 18 seconds into the flight, when cabin pressure dropped from 5.5 to 1 lb/in² (38 to 7 kPa). This malfunction was traced later to the air inlet snorkel valve. Vibrations had loosened a pin in the snorkel valve and allowed the valve to open. Ham was safe in his own couch spacesuit and did not suffer any ill effects from the loss of cabin pressure. His couch spacesuit pressure remained normal, and suit temperature stayed well within the 60 to 80 degrees Fahrenheit (16 to 26 °C) optimum range.

At apogee Ham's spacecraft was  farther downrange than planned. Ham was weightless for 6.6 minutes instead of the 4.9 minutes that were planned. The spacecraft landed  downrange after a 16.5-minute flight. He received 14.7 g (144 m/s²) during reentry, almost 3 g (29 m/s²) greater than planned.

Ham performed his tasks well, pushing levers about 50 times during the flight. Onboard cameras filming Ham's reaction to weightlessness showed a surprising amount of dust and debris floating around inside the capsule during apogee. 

The spacecraft splashed down about 12:12 pm. EST, out of sight from recovery forces. About 12 minutes later, the first recovery signal was received from the spacecraft. Twenty-seven minutes after landing, a search plane sighted the capsule floating upright in the Atlantic. The search plane requested that the Navy send its rescue helicopters from the closest ship carrying them.

When helicopters arrived they found the spacecraft on its side, taking on water, and submerging. Upon water impact, the beryllium heat shield had bounced against the capsule bottom, punching two holes in the titanium pressure bulkhead. The landing bag had worn badly, and the heatshield was torn free from the spacecraft before recovery. After the craft capsized, the open snorkel valve let still more sea water enter the capsule. When the spacecraft was opened Ham appeared to be in good condition and readily accepted an apple and half an orange.

Post-flight

With the malfunctions during the flight, the Mercury-Redstone was deemed not ready for a human passenger planned for MR-3. It was postponed pending a final booster development flight, Mercury-Redstone BD.

After his spaceflight, Ham was transferred to the National Zoo in Washington, D.C. for 17 years and then in 1981 was moved to a zoo in North Carolina to live with a colony of other chimpanzees. He died on January 19, 1983, at the age of 26. Ham is buried at the New Mexico Museum of Space History in Alamogordo, New Mexico. He was one of many animals in space.

Ham's backup, Minnie, was the only female chimpanzee trained for the Mercury program. After her role in the Mercury program ended, Minnie became part of an Air Force chimp-breeding program, producing nine offspring and helping raise the offspring of several other members of the chimpanzee colony. She was the last surviving astro-chimp. She died at the age of 41 on March 14, 1998.

Mercury spacecraft No. 5, used in the Mercury-Redstone 2 mission, is currently displayed at the California Science Center, Los Angeles, California.

Mercury Redstone 2 sub-orbital flight events

See also
Monkeys and apes in space
Animals in space
Splashdown (spacecraft landing)
Aerocapture

References

This New Ocean: A History of Project Mercury – NASA SP-4201
NASA NSSDC Master Catalog
Mercury spacecraft #5 display page on A Field Guide to American Spacecraft website.
Postlaunch Report for Mercury-Redstone No. 2 (MR-2)

External links 

 Chimp Ham: "Trailblazer In Space" 1961 Detroit News

Project Mercury
1961 in spaceflight